John Gjerde (born 10 May 1929 in Sande) is a Norwegian politician for the Liberal Party.

He served as a deputy representative to the Norwegian Parliament from Møre og Romsdal during the term 1977–1981.

On the local level Gjerde held various positions in Sande municipality council from 1959 to 1964 and 1971 to 1987, serving as mayor from 1975.

References

1929 births
Living people
Liberal Party (Norway) politicians
Mayors of places in Møre og Romsdal
Deputy members of the Storting